Jennie Muskett is a British Emmy winning and Bafta nominated film and TV composer.

Biography
Jennie Muskett has lived in London, South Africa and LA and has established an international reputation as a composer for film and television, having written scores for Miramax, Paramount, Disney, IMAX, the BBC and many more.

Over the years Muskett has also made her mark in Hollywood as a composer with scores such as her lyrical music for The Prince and Me (2004) directed by Martha Coolidge and her comedy score for Material Girls (2005), starring Hilary Duff and Anjelica Huston.

She has provided high-profile TV scores, most recently for the critically acclaimed BBC film, Miss Austen Regrets (2008) and Compulsion starring Ray Winston. Muskett has also been awarded 2 BAFTA nominations for her scores for the series Spooks, for which she also composed the theme, and more recently, the mini-series The State Within received two Golden Globe nominations.

Muskett trained at the Royal College of Music in London and soon after began a career as a cellist, playing for named UK orchestras. Her composing career began when she was invited to write the music for a natural history documentary which, in turn, spurred further commissions in this genre. She worked for production companies such as National Geographic, Discovery, the BBC and IMAX. Muskett’s passion for the environment and her fascination with the natural world inspired a diverse ethnicity in her scores. Inevitably Muskett’s documentary work has received praise, winning her 2 Emmy’s and 5 Emmy nominations.

Muskett has a studio in LA and another in Highgate, London and divides her time between them, working in both film and TV.

Scores

A Passion for Angling | BBC
Dir. Hugh Miles
MATERIAL GIRLS
Dir. Martha Coolidge | MGM
THE PRINCE AND ME
Dir. Martha Coolidge | Paramount
DANIEL DEFOE’S ROBINSON CRUSOE
Exec Prod. Harvey Weinstein | Miramax
B. Monkey
Dir. Michael Radford | Scala/Miramax
MR. IN-BETWEEN
Dir. Paul Sarossy | Phantom Pictures
BOXED
Dir. Marion Comer | Fireproof Films
SURVIVAL ISLAND
With SIR DAVID ATTENBOROUGH | IMAX
THE SECRETS OF LIFE ON EARTH
With SIR DAVID ATTENBOROUGH | IMAX

MISS AUSTEN REGRETS | BBC FILMS
Dir. Jeremy Lovering
COMPULSION | Size 9 productions
Dir. Sarah Harding
THE STATE WITHIN Mini-Series
Dirs. Michael Offer & Daniel Percival | BBC & BBC AMERICA
Golden Globe nominated for best mini series
SPOOKS (MI-5) Seasons 1-6
Dirs. Bharat Nalluri, Justin Chadwick and others| Kudos Productions
BAFTA NOMINATION for BEST ORIGINAL MUSIC 2003
BAFTA AWARD for BEST DRAMA SERIES 2003
BAFTA NOMINATION for BEST ORIGINAL MUSIC 2005
CD of Spooks score released by Cube Soundtracks 2005
PENGUINS
Dir. Mark Fletcher | BBC
PIZZA WARS
ABC/DISNEY TV
SAME AS IT NEVER WAS
ABC/DISNEY TV
THE TWELVE DAYS OF CHRISTMAS EVE
Dir. Martha Coolidge | Granada America
SECRET KILLERS
Dir. Paul Atkins | National Geographic
EMMY NOMINATION for BEST ORIGINAL MUSIC 2003
SHOCKERS
DEAD GORGEOUS
Dir. Sarah Harding | Feasible Films
TOO GOOD TO BE TRUE
Dir. Sarah Harding | Granada
Baka – People of the Rainforest
Dir. Phil Agland | River Films/Channel 4
BAFTA AWARD WINNER for BEST DOCUMENTARY
JEWELS OF THE CARIBBEAN
National Geographic/NBC
EMMY AWARD for BEST OUTSTANDING ORIGINAL SCORE
SPIRITS OF THE FOREST
DISCOVERY CHANNEL
EMMY AWARD for BEST OUTSTANDING ORIGINAL SCORE
PEOPLE OF THE FOREST
National Geographic
WINNER OF THE PEABODY AWARD
SELWYN’S LUCKY DAY Animation 10' Short
Dir. Andrew Peters | Spotty Dog Films
GREAT WHITE SHARK
NBC/NATIONAL GEOGRAPHIC
EMMY NOMINATED for BEST OUTSTANDING ORIGINAL SCORE

References 

Living people
Year of birth missing (living people)
British television composers
People from Highgate
Place of birth missing (living people)
Alumni of the Royal College of Music